Zarkuiyeh (also Romanized as Zārkū’īyeh and Zarkoo’eyeh; also known as Zārkūh) is a village in Jorjafak Rural District, in the Central District of Zarand County, Kerman Province, Iran. At the 2006 census, its population was 32, in 10 families.

References 

Populated places in Zarand County